The Australian tern or Australian gull-billed tern (Gelochelidon macrotarsa) is a tern in the family Laridae.  The genus name is from Ancient Greek gelao, "to laugh", and khelidon, "swallow". It was previously considered conspecific with the gull-billed tern.

Taxonomy
John Gould described Sterna macrotarsa from a specimen held at Kings College, London in 1837.

Description
This is a fairly large and powerful tern, similar in size and general appearance to a Sandwich tern, but the short thick gull-like bill, broad wings, long legs and robust body are distinctive. The summer adult has grey upperparts, white underparts, a black cap, strong black bill and black legs. The call is a characteristic ker-wik.

In winter, the cap is lost, and there is a dark patch through the eye like a Forster's tern or a Mediterranean gull. Juvenile Australian terns have a fainter mask, but otherwise look much like winter adults.

Range
It breeds in Australia and New Guinea.

Life history
This species breeds in colonies on lakes, marshes and coasts. It nests in a ground scrape and lays two to five eggs.

This is a somewhat atypical tern, in appearance like a Sterna tern, but with feeding habits more like the Chlidonias marsh terns, black tern and white-winged tern. 

The Australian gull-billed tern does not normally plunge dive for fish like the other white terns, and has a broader diet than most other terns. It largely feeds on insects taken in flight, and also often hunts over wet fields and even in brushy areas, to take amphibians and small mammals. It is also an opportunistic feeder, and has been observed to pick up and feed on dead dragonflies from the road.

Gallery

References

External links
 
 

Australian tern
Birds of Australia
Australian tern
Australian tern